The Marshal of the United States Supreme Court heads the United States Supreme Court Police, a security police service answerable to the court itself rather than to the president or attorney general. They handle security for the Supreme Court building and for the justices personally.

Legal basis
In accordance with :

To carry out these duties,  authorizes the Marshal to police the Supreme Court building and protect the Justices, employees of the Court, and visitors to the Court. The Marshal also has authority to make arrests in carrying out these duties.

At the beginning of each session of the Court, the 10 a.m. entrance of the Justices into the Courtroom is announced by the Marshal. Those present, at the sound of the gavel, arise and remain standing until the robed Justices are seated following the traditional chant: "The Honorable, the Chief Justice and the Associate Justices of the Supreme Court of the United States. Oyez! Oyez! Oyez! All persons having business before the Honorable, the Supreme Court of the United States, are admonished to draw near and give their attention, for the Court is now sitting. God save the United States and this Honorable Court!"

List of Marshals
The office of Marshal was created by statute in 1867. The Marshals since that date have been:

Richard C. Parsons (1867–1872)
John G. Nicolay (1872–1887)
John M. Wright (1888–1915)
Frank Key Green (1915–1938)
Thomas E. Waggaman (1938–1952)
T. Perry Lippitt (1952–1972)
Frank M. Hepler (1972–1976)
Alfred M. Wong (1976–1994)
Dale E. Bosley (1994–2001)
Pamela Talkin (2001–2020)
Gail A. Curley (2021–present)

On July 7, 2020, the Court announced that Marshal Talkin would retire effective July 31, 2020, after 19 years as Marshal and 47 total years of federal employment. Her successor, Gail A. Curley, was announced on May 3, 2021, and assumed her duties on June 21, 2021.

See also
 United States Supreme Court Police – The federal law enforcement body led by the Marshal of the United States Supreme Court.
 United States Marshals Service – The United States Marshals Service also executes all lawful writs, processes, and orders issued under the authority of the United States, and shall command all necessary assistance to execute its duties.

References

External links
 US Supreme Court Building Regulations
 US Supreme Court Visitor's Guide

Supreme Court of the United States people
Marshals of the United States Supreme Court